Modelu is a commune in Călărași County, Muntenia, Romania. It is composed of four villages: Modelu, Radu Negru, Stoenești and Tonea.

It has a population of 9,835 people. Since 2004, the mayor has been Gheorghe Dobre of the National Liberal Party.

References

Modelu
Localities in Muntenia